The black-necked weaver (Ploceus nigricollis) is a resident breeding bird species in much of central Africa from Cameroon in the east to Kenya and southern Somalia in the west.

Taxonomy and systematics 
The species was formally described in 1805 by the French ornithologist Louis Jean Pierre Vieillot, who named it Malimbus nigricollis. The description was based on a specimen that had been collected near Malimbe, now Malembo, in the Cabinda Province of Angola. The species epithet nigricollis combines the Latin words Latin words, niger meaning "black" and collis meaning "necked".

Subspecies 
There are two subspecies recognized:
 P. n. nigricollis - (Vieillot, 1805): Found from eastern Cameroon to southern Sudan, western Kenya, north-western Tanzania, southern Democratic Republic of Congo and Angola. Also on the island of on Bioko
 P. n. melanoxanthus - (Cabanis, 1878): Found from southern Ethiopia and southern Somalia to central and eastern Kenya and north-eastern Tanzania

The black-necked weaver was formerly considered to be conspecific with the olive-naped weaver. The two species differ in plumage and in the colour of the iris. A molecular study published in 2019 found that the two species are genetically very similar.

Description 
The black-necked weaver is a stocky 16 cm bird with a strong conical bill. The adult male of the northern race has olive upper-parts and wings, and yellow underparts and head. It has a black eye-mask and bib, and a pale yellow iris. The non-breeding male has a yellow head with an olive crown, grey upper-parts and whitish. The wings remain yellow and black.

The adult female also has olive upper-parts and wings, and yellow underparts and head. It has a black eyemask but no bib.

The southern race found from Nigeria eastwards has a quite different appearance, with almost black upper-parts and tail.

The black-necked weaver feeds on insects and vegetable matter. The calls of this bird include a wheezing dew-dew-twee .

Distribution and habitat
This weaver occurs in forests, especially in wet habitats.

Behaviour and ecology
It builds a large coarsely woven nest made of grass and creepers with a 15 cm downward facing entrance tunnel hanging from the globular egg chamber. The nest is suspended from a branch in a tree and 2-3 eggs are laid. It nests in pairs but forms small flocks when not breeding.

References

 Birds of The Gambia by Barlow, Wacher and Disley,

External links
 Black-necked weaver -  Species text in Weaver Watch.

black-necked weaver
Birds of Sub-Saharan Africa
black-necked weaver
black-necked weaver